Soupir is a commune in the Aisne department in Hauts-de-France in northern France.

History
Located south of the Chemin des Dames, the village was largely destroyed during the Second Battle of the Aisne in World War I. Today, five national cemeteries are located in Soupir: two for France, and one each for Germany, the UK, and Italy.

Population

See also
 Communes of the Aisne department

References

Communes of Aisne
Aisne communes articles needing translation from French Wikipedia